The Roman Catholic Diocese of Zacatecas (erected 26 January 1863) is a suffragan diocese of the Archdiocese of San Luis Potosí, in San Luis Potosí, Mexico. It was a suffragan of the Archdiocese of Guadalajara, in Guadalajara, Mexico, until 25 November 2006.

According to an official news release from the Holy See Press Office's Vatican Information Service (VIS), on August 2, 2012, Pope Benedict XVI appointed Sigifredo Noriega Barceló as the fifteenth Bishop of the Roman Catholic Diocese of Zacatecas, transferring him from his post as the first Bishop of the Roman Catholic Diocese of Ensenada in Ensenada, Mexico, which is a suffragan diocese in the Ecclesiastical Province of the Roman Catholic Archdiocese of Tijuana in Tijuana, Mexico. Bishop Sigifredo Noriega Barceló was born in Granados, Sonora, Mexico, on October 12, 1951. He attended a Minor Seminary in the Roman Catholic Diocese of Ciudad Obregon, Mexico, then studied Philosophy in the Seminary of Montezuma in the United States. The Bishop then studied Theology in the Diocesan Seminary of Tijuana. Later he obtained a Licentiate in Sacred Theology Degree in Moral Theology from the Alphonsian Academy in Rome. He was ordained to the presbyterate (the Catholic priesthood) on October 7, 1976, and was then incardinated in the Roman Catholic Diocese of Ciudad Obregon, Mexico. As a priest, he held the following positions: priest, Spiritual Director and Vice-Rector of the Minor Seminary, Prefect of Studies in the Major Seminary, Diocesan Promoter of Vocations, a Member of the Presbyteral Council, the College of Consultors, Council d Administration of the University of La Salle, Diocesan Assessor for the Family. Then, from 2006 to 2007, the Bishop served as Vicar General of the Roman Catholic Diocese of Ciudad Obregon. Then, on January 26, 2007, he was appointed the first Bishop of the Roman Catholic Diocese of Ensenada, Mexico, and received Episcopal Ordination on 25 April 2007.

Bishops

Ordinaries
Ignacio Mateo Guerra y Alba (1864–1871)
José Maríe del Refugio Guerra y Alva (1872–1888)
Buenaventura del Purísimo Corazón de María Portillo y Tejeda, O.F.M. (1888–1899)
José Guadalupe de Jesús de Alba y Franco, O.F.M. (1899–1910)
Miguel María de la Mora y Mora (1911–1922), appointed Bishop of San Luis Potosí
Ignacio Placencia y Moreira (1922–1951), Archbishop (personal title)
Francisco Javier Nuño y Guerrero (1951–1954), appointed Coadjutor Archbishop of Guadalajara, Jalisco
Antonio López Aviña (1955–1961), appointed Archbishop of Durango
Adalberto Almeida y Merino (1962–1969), appointed Archbishop of Chihuahua
José Pablo Rovalo Azcué, S.M. (1970–1972)
Rafael Muñoz Nuñez (1972–1984), appointed Bishop of Aguascalientes
Javier Lozano Barragán (1984–1997)
Fernando Mario Chávez Ruvalcaba (1999–2008)
Carlos Cabrero Romero (2008–2012), appointed Archbishop of San Luis Potosí
Sigifredo Noriega Barceló (since 2012)

Coadjutor bishop
Francisco Javier Nuño y Guerrero (1951)

Territorial losses

Episcopal See
Zacatecas, Zacatecas

External links and references

References 

Zacatecas
Zacatecas, Roman Catholic Diocese of
Zacatecas
Zacatecas
1863 establishments in Mexico